There are a number of caving organizations throughout the world.

UIS
The Union Internationale de Spéléologie (UIS) is the international umbrella organization for caving and speleology.

Austria
The Austrian Speleological Association, formed in 1949, represents over 20 caving clubs, with some 2500 members and about 30 show caves in Austria, and is the Austrian member of UIS and FSE.

Australia
Australian Speleological Federation (ASF) is a national organisation formed in 1956. It is an environmental organisation promoting the protection of Australia's unique cave systems.

Bosnia and Herzegovina
The Speleological Society Ponir (SD Ponir) was founded in 1984 in Banja Luka. The main activities of the society are cave exploration and research. In furtherance of this, SD Ponir conducts training of new members through courses and caving expeditions. The training  includes theoretical courses (training in the form of lectures related to: speleohistory, speleomorphology, biospeleology, topography, first aid, etc.) and practical training (use of caving equipment and mastering verticals, and cave surveying). SD Ponir has organized a number of expeditions, which has explored many caves in the territory of BiH. SD Ponir is currently exploring the two biggest ones in the territory of BiH-Jojkinovac (460m deep).

Brazil
Brazilian Speleological Society (SBE) is a national organisation formed in 1969. SBE is member of UIS (Union International de Spéléologie) and FEALC (Federación Espeleológica de América Latina y el Caribe).

Bulgaria

The first Bulgarian Speleological Society was founded on March 18, 1929. This was the result of the acknowledged necessity to set up a public organization which, under the conditions prevalent at that time, would begin a systematic investigation of caves, protecting them from destruction and setting the beginnings of cave tourism. The founders of the Society were eminent Bulgarian scientists, people active in the realm of tourism, and cave-exploration fans - office employees and workers. The foundation of the first Bulgarian Speleological Society marked the beginning of a new stage in the development of Speleology in Bulgaria.

Though not very numerous in its membership, and despite its limited financial capacities, the Society engaged in huge-scale and useful activities. It made a reappraisal of all that had been done until that time in cave investigation and in obtaining more knowledge about the country's caves. Organized trips and studies were carried out in certain caves and karst regions of Bulgaria. The results obtained were published in the scientific publication of the Society - "Bulletin of the Bulgarian Speleological Society" - Volume One of which appeared in 1936. Active propaganda was also carried out for the protection of the caves. There was a useful and active cooperation between the Bulgarian Speleological Society and the Bulgarian Tourist Union.

The first provincial branches of the Society were founded in the Rakitovo village and the towns of Dryanovo and Lovech. The Bulgarian Speleological Society became more active after 1947. New members entered the Society, which included university students as well. In 1948 and 1949 they took part with great enthusiasm in what were known as the cave brigades organized with the generous support of the Bulgarian Academy of Sciences. Detailed investigations were carried out during this period of the karst regions of Lakatnik, Karloukovo, Rabisha (near Belogradchik), and Zlatna Panega in Lovech District. The charts prepared and the materials collected constituted an important scientific contribution.

After 1949 the Bulgarian Speleological Society ceased its activities over a brief period of time. A good deal of work was done by the speleologists in the town of Rousse and by university students organized in their Speleological Club "Akademik" in Sofia. Amateur work continued, as well as the research initiated in this field by the various institutes of the Bulgarian Academy of Sciences and by the Sofia University. However, there was a keenly felt need for a speleological organization in the country.

Such an organization was necessary to unite the efforts of amateur speleologists and of the specialists and to promote the development of this branch of science in Bulgaria. Favourable conditions to that effect were created after 1957, with the restoration of the Bulgarian Tourist Union. At that time a number of scientists and amateur speleologists, as well as active supporters of the tourist movement, approached the Central Council of the Bulgarian Tourist Union with a proposal to set up a Committee for Cave Tourism. On July 14, 1958, the Central Council decided on setting up a Commission on Speleology and Cave Tourism. Forty-two clubs were set up all over the country.

With the generous support of the Central Council of the Bulgarian Tourist Union, the new speleological organization rapidly grew in strength and became very active. Its objectives became clearly formulated and presented, and a number of enactments were passed. There were also a number of additional initiatives, such as plenary sessions, conferences, gatherings, and international expeditions. Penetration, charting, and survey work in the known caves and in the discovery of new cave sites became more active and on a higher scientific and technological level. The Commission on Speleology and Cave Tourism took on the task of the development and popularization of cave tourism in Bulgaria.

After the Fourth Congress of the Bulgarian Tourist Union in 1972, the Commission on Speleology and Cave Tourism was transformed into the Bulgarian Federation on Speleology, which continues operating today. This new and higher form of organization furnished a fresh impetus to the development of Speleology in Bulgaria. Its operation became more active and efficient. New initiatives were undertaken with a view to improving the training and qualifications of the speleologists in the country. The speleological clubs obtained new equipment, and their activity increased. International ties grew stronger and broader. The successes attained were largely due to the correct understanding and to the moral and material support, which was and is still rendered by the Central Council of the Bulgarian Tourist Union.

Today, the Bulgarian Federation on Speleology is the only national organization in Bulgaria whose role is essentially devoted to Speleology. The Federation represents the Bulgarian cavers and speleologists. In this capacity, it organizes National Congresses, and within the International Union of Speleology it nominates the Bulgarian delegates at the International Congresses. The Federation co-ordinates both the activities of Bulgarian cavers abroad, establishing contacts with the corresponding Societies, and the activity of foreign cavers in Bulgaria.

With 900 members in 2009, the Federation is organized on a national level (an executive committee, a board of directors, a head office in Sofia), and on the regional level it has 35 speleo clubs. The Bulgarian Federation on Speleology, with its members - research workers and amateurs, is the sole organization in Bulgaria working for the advance of speleology and of cave tourism, and it is also the foremost unit carrying out the requisite research and protection of caves in the country. Bulgarian Federation of Speleology is a member of Balkan Speleological Union, European Federation of Speleology and International Speleological Union (U.I.S).

Canada
There is no national caving organization in Canada, despite the existence of a national publication (the Canadian Caver, started in 1968), and the Caving Canada website. Regional organizations exist in British Columbia and Quebec, and caving clubs exist in many of the provinces (Alberta Speleological Society, Northern British Columbia Caving Club, Speleological Society of Manitoba, etc.) and cities (Toronto Caving Group).

China
Hong Meigui is an international society dedicated to the exploration of caves in China and throughout the world.

Czech Republic
Czech Speleological Society / Česká speleologická společnost is the national organisation with many caving clubs as members.

Europe
The Fédération Spéléologique Européenne / European Speleological Federation (FSE) is the European organisation which federates the national caving federations/associations in Europe.

France
French Federation of Speleology is the national organisation with many caving clubs as members.

Germany
The German Speleological Federation was founded in 1955 and is the German member of UIS and FSE.

Greece

The Hellenic Speleological Federation is the only secondary national organisation in Greece and has many caving clubs as members. There are a number of independent clubs outside the Federation.
The Hellenic Speleological Society (established in 1950) is a nationwide caving society in Greece. With six (6) Branches and main offices in Athens conducts Caving Expeditions and Studies all over the country.

Hungary

The Hungarian Speleology Society was founded in 1926. Our society was reorganized by enlarging its profile in 1958 under the name of Hungarian Karst- and Cave Research Society (MKBT). MKBT carries out speleological research and exploration in Hungary. The national yearly publication is called Karszt és Barlang (meaning  Karst and Cave).

India
The National Cave Research and Protection Organization is the Non-Government Organisation Registered for cave Research & their Protection in India.

Speleological Association of India (SAI) is a registered non-profit organization launched on 4 October 2021. Through scientific exploration, study, research, public education, awareness, and training, the organization aims to inculcate a sense of ownership and stewardship; which will lead to conservation, protection, and advocacy of the caves, karsts and other systems in Indian Subcontinent.

Indonesia
The Indonesian Speleological Society (ISS) formed in 2015 with some 1000 members and is the Indonesian member of UIS. Their website is caves.or.id

Iran
The Iranian Cave and Speleology Association (ICSA) is a non-governmental organisation (NGO) consisting of cavers and speleologists in Iran who are interested in exploring, surveying, researching and protecting the caves of Iran. The International Speleology Union (UIS) helped with the foundation of the ICSA by training cavers and supporting them. It was founded in 2010 with permission from the Ministry of Interior. ICSA now helps governmental organisation (Such as Environment Protection Organisation, Tourism Organisation, Universities) and other non-governmental organisations (like Red Crescent Society of the Islamic Republic of Iran, Iranian Geologist Association, Iranian Photographer Association) with such issues.

Note: Iranian Federation of Mountaineering and Sport Climbing is the governmental organisation of Mountain Sports which regards caving as a sport. Focused on the sporting aspect of caving, they provide training to cavers.

Ireland
The Speleological Union of Ireland is the official representative body for cavers in Ireland. It is also affiliated with the Irish Cave Rescue Organisation which operates in both the Republic Of Ireland and Northern Ireland.

Israel
Israel Cave Explorers Club is the largest and most active caving club in Israel. It was founded in 2016, and the members are involved with organising international caving expeditions, surveying, conservation, hosting caver expeditions in Israel, and helping the local archeological bodies in excavating, mapping and finding caves around Israel.

Italy
The Italian Speleological Society is the official representative body for many cavers and Groups in Italy.

The Circolo Speleologico Romano was founded in 1904, is one of the oldest caving clubs in Italy. Currently, more than 250 caving groups and clubs are present in the country, with about 4,000 active cavers.

Kosovo
The Speleological Federation of Kosovo was formed in February 2011. In 2003 the first speleo association was formed (Aragonit Speleo Association), independent from the mountain association of Gjeravica from the western city of Peja (formed 1928), where it worked as a speleo-section. It is working on completing data for all the caves in this country, and also organizing different speleo-expeditions throughout the country. www.aragonit-speleo.org  www.facebook.com/aragonitkosovo

Kyrgyzstan
Foundation for the Preservation and Exploration of Caves (FPEC) was formed in 2010. The main activities are: Complex Speleological Investigation of karst and caves in Central Asia; Speleoarcheology; Paleoclimate; Biospeleology; etc. FPEC is a member of UIS since July 2017.

Lebanon
Speleo Club du Liban was formed in 1951. It is considered one of the oldest caving associations in the Middle East.

Jamaica
The Jamaican Caves Organisation (JCO) is the national caving organisation for Jamaica, and a member of the Union Internationale de Spéléologie (UIS). Activities include speleological research, exploration, mapping, and pro bono assistance to the National Environmental and Planning Agency (NEPA), the Water Resources Authority (WRA), the University of the West Indies (UWI), and visiting researchers.

México
 Grupo Espeleológico Ajau - Ajau Speleological Group, an organization made up of enthusiasts and professionals from many different disciplines, does exploration and research mainly in and around the Yucatán Peninsula.

Mongolia 
 Mongolian Cave Research Association is a Nongovernmental Organization (NGO). Mongolian Cave Research Association was established in 2007 and conducts a varied range of cave expeditions in Mongolia.

Netherlands
Speleo Nederland is the national organisation with four regional sections. The national 3 monthly publication is called "Pierk" (meaning stalactite).

New Zealand
The New Zealand Speleological Society is a national organisation with local clubs that represents the recreational cavers.

Norway
Norsk Grotteforbund (The Norwegian Speleological Society) is the national organisation. It was established in 1980.

Pakistan
Chiltan Adventurers Association Balochistan and Pakistan Cave Research & Caving Federation the only  National Caving Organization in Pakistan founded by Hayatullah Khan Durrani representative of Union of International Speleology(UIS), and British Caving Federation (BCA) through Orpheus Caving Club Derby UK.

Poland
Caving Committee of Polish Mountaineering Association (Polski Związek Alpinizmu) represents the Polish caving community as a whole.

In Poland, caving community has been traditionally tied closely to mountaineering. Polish Mountaineering Association gathers 26 local associations whose main profile is recreational caving and cave exploration.

Portugal
 Federação Portuguesa de Espeleologia
 The Portuguese Speleological Society was founded on 1948.

Romania
The Romanian Speleological Federation was founded on 28 May 1994 by the association of all speleological structures from Romania, having as goal to strengthen the national speleological activities. FRS is a member of UIS (Union International de Spéléologie), affiliated to UNESCO.

Russia
 Russian Speleological Union (Rossijskij sojuz speleologov, RSS) is all-Russian public organization which unites the speleologists of Russia.
 Ekaterinburg Speleo Club (SGS)

South Africa
 Cave Research Organisation of South Africa (CROSA)
 The South African Speleological Association (SASA), is the national body for caving in South Africa (Self Nominated).
 Speleological Exploration Club (SEC)

Spain
 The Federación Española de Espeleología is the Spanish Speleological Association. There are also twelve Regional Associations ("Federaciones Autonómicas" in Spanish), and people must be associated with one of them so they can do caving.
 GERS de l'A.E. Muntanya is a group from Barcelona focused on the exploration of new caves in Pirineos mountains and urban speleology.

Sweden
The Swedish Speleological Society is the national body for caving in Sweden. It was founded in 1966 by the "Father of Swedish Speleology", Leander Tell.

Switzerland
The Swiss Society of Speleology was created in 1939 in Geneva.

Turkey
MF (Speleological Federation of Turkey)
Cave Research Association is the oldest cave research association in Turkey.  Its central organisation is in Ankara and it has a branch in Bursa.  MAD arranges cave expeditions and promotes speleology in Turkey.  MAD has more than 100 members with approximately 40 of them actively working.
BÜMAK (Boğaziçi University Speleological Society) is the oldest University Club of the country. The Club has explored EGMA, deepest cave in Turkey (-1429 m deep) and is still actively finding and exploring new caves all around the country.
BUMAD (Boğaziçi International Cave Exploration Society) is a caving society relatively recently founded but full of experienced members. Participated in ecological survey of the Thrace region and still actively searching for new caves.
ESMAD (Eskişehir Cave Research Association)
ANÜMAB (Ankara University Cave Research Unit) was founded on November 4, 2004. ANÜMAB makes scientific researches which include geological, biological and archaeological studies in Turkey, mostly Ankara and its surround.
İTÜMAK (İstanbul Technical University Cave Exploration Society) is a University Club that has been continuing its work since 2007.

Ukraine
 The Ukrainian Speleological Association (USA) is a Ukrainian national non-profit membership organization created in 1992. Member of Union International of Speleology (UIS) since 1992 and European Speleological Federation (ESF) since 2012. The main goal is to support and develop the caving activities of clubs, sections and individual members. Every year the organization conducts expeditions to the world's deepest caves, for example Krubera Cave.

United Kingdom
 The British Caving Association is the national body for caving in the United Kingdom. It represents all those persons and groups with a genuine interest in caves, karst and associated phenomena, whether from a strictly sporting viewpoint, a scientific viewpoint, or a combination of both.
 The British Cave Research Association is a constituent body of the British Caving Association and promotes the study of caves and associated phenomena. The association encourages original exploration, collects and publishes speleological information, and organises educational events.
 The Council of Higher Education Caving Clubs acts as an umbrella group for all university caving clubs to facilitate interactions within and between clubs, and to represent them to higher caving authorities within the UK and Europe.

United States
 The National Speleological Society (NSS) is a national non-profit membership organization formed in 1941 with the purpose "to promote interest in and to advance in any and all ways the study and science of speleology, the protection of caves and their natural contents, and to promote fellowship among those interested therein."  Most of the Society's approximately 12,000 members belong to local chapters known as Grottos.  The Society maintains an active online discussion forum to discuss caving. Anyone interested in caving or caves is invited to participate.
 The Cave Research Foundation (CRF) is an American private, non-profit group dedicated to the exploration, research, and conservation of caves.

References

 
Lists of organizations